Eddy Martin (born September 10, 1990) is an American actor and musician. He is best known for his roles as One Love in the movie Rebound, and as Joaquin in the Nickelodeon original show Just Jordan.

He sings a variety of music including mariachi music, ballads, and pop. He plays the drums and piano, and writes his own music.

He starred in the 2003 television movie The Maldonado Miracle, directed by Salma Hayek. He played the role of Jose Maldonado, a lonely migrant boy searching for his father.

He appeared as Roberto in the second season of the PBS drama American Family, directed by Gregory Nava, which aired in 2004.

Eddy played Thad, one of the Dalton Academy Warblers, on the television series Glee.

He starred as Junior in the 2013 movie Our Boys, directed by Leonardo Ricagni.

Filmography

Film

References

External links

1990 births
Living people
Male actors from California
American male child actors
Hispanic and Latino American male actors